Triathlon competitions at the 2015 Pan American Games in Toronto were held from July 11 to 12 at the Ontario Place West Channel. The Pan American Games triathlon contained three components; a  swim,  cycle, and a  run. There was a total of two medal events in the sport (one each for men and women).

Competition schedule

The following was the competition schedule for the triathlon competitions:

Medal table

Medalists

Participating nations
A total of 24 countries qualified triathletes. The number of triathletes a nation entered is in parentheses beside the name of the country.

Qualification

A total of 70 triathletes (35 men and 35 women) qualified to compete at the games. A nation could enter a maximum of six athletes (three per gender). Triathletes qualified through various qualification events and rankings in 2014 and 2015. The host nation Canada, automatically qualified a full team of six athletes. There was an additional three wild card spots per gender awarded.

See also
Triathlon at the 2016 Summer Olympics

References

 
Events at the 2015 Pan American Games
2015
Pan American Games